Barcaldine may refer to:

Australia 
 Barcaldine, Queensland, Australia
Barcaldine Airport, Queensland Australia
Barcaldine Region, a local government area in Queensland, Australia
 Shire of Barcaldine, a former local government area in Queensland, Australia

United Kingdom 
Barcaldine (horse), a British Thoroughbred racehorse
Barcaldine, Argyll, Scotland, United Kingdom

ro:Barcaldine